The Town of Bassendean in Perth, Western Australia was established as the West Guildford Road District, with a chairman and councillors, on 10 May 1901 under the District Roads Act 1871. It was renamed Bassendean on 7 July 1922. With the passage of the Local Government Act 1960, all road districts became Shires, with a president and councillors, effective 1 July 1961. On 1 July 1975, the Shire of Bassendean became the Town of Bassendean, with a mayor and councillors.

The female mayor was Vicki Philipoff, who was elected in 1995, and served two years.

West Guildford Road District

Bassendean Road District

Shire of Bassendean

Town of Bassendean

References

Lists of local government leaders in Western Australia
Town of Bassendean